The Germ is an album by the California punk band Victim's Family. It was their first to be released on the Alternative Tentacles label, after departing Mordam Records.

The album's cover illustration, titled "Yellow Head," was created by Harvey Stafford.

Critical reception
AllMusic praised the album's break from traditional hardcore, writing that some songs "are closer to the tripped-out indie psychedelia of Screaming Trees or Meat Puppets."

Track listing
 "The Germ" (3:07)
 "I Pissed on a Tree" (3:08 )
 "3 Piece Loincloth" (2:07)
 "Instant Gratification" (0:44)
 "Mind You" (1:30)
 "I'm Such a Jerk" (2:41)
 "New World Hors D'Oeuvre" (2:03)
 "Baklava" (2:57)
 "Bad Karma" (2:24)
 "Insidious" (3:15)
 "Vinnie + 1" (2:25)
 "Er What?" (1:35)
 "Fuck Richard Up" (1:11)
 "Who Needs It?" (2:40)
 "My Evil Twin" (3:38 )
 "Lack of Interest" (1:36)
 "Bogus Track" (1:00)

References

Victims Family albums
1992 albums
Alternative Tentacles albums